Pietro Salvatore Colombo, OFM (28 October 1922 - 9 July 1989) was the Catholic bishop of the Diocese of Mogadiscio (Somalia) from 1976 until his assassination.

Biography 
Colombo was born in Carate Brianza, near Milan. He served the people of Somalia from 1946, after he had been ordained a priest in Milan, Italy, until his death 43 years later. He was appointed as the first Bishop of Mogadishu in 1975, and ordained as Bishop of Mogadishu on 16 March 1976.

Bishop Colombo was well regarded by non-Catholics, whether Muslim or secular. Bishop Colombo was known for his pragmatic oversight of aid projects, making sure that aid projects could operate after the foreign aid workers went home. The government of President Siad Barre did not tolerate proselytizing, but was comfortable with the humanitarian aid dispensed by the Church.

Bishop Colombo was killed in his cathedral by an unknown assassin. President Barre blamed radical Islamists and offered a bounty for their capture.

No bishop has been appointed for Mogadishu since Monsignor Colombo's death. Currently, the welfare of Catholics in Somalia is overseen by the Apostolic Administrator of Mogadishu, Dr. Giorgio Bertin, OFM, who is also the Bishop of Djibouti.

See also
Italian Somalis

Footnotes

1922 births
1989 deaths
Italian Roman Catholic bishops in Africa
Italian expatriates in Somalia
20th-century Roman Catholic bishops in Somalia
English Friars Minor
20th-century Roman Catholic martyrs
People murdered in Somalia
Italian people murdered abroad
People from Brianza
Roman Catholic bishops of Mogadishu
1989 murders in Africa
1980s murders in Somalia